"I Ran Away with a Truck Driver" is a 9-page romance comics story published in Teen-Age Romances, No. 23 by St. John Publishing in August 1952 with art (and possibly script) by Matt Baker.  The story tells of a small town girl rebelling against parents  who want to send her to a girls' college. She would rather attend a coed school. However, she runs away to Chicago with a handsome young truck driver who promises her thrills galore.  He steals her money and abandons her in the city. Disillusioned, she returns to her parents, abides by their wishes, and enters a wholesome relationship with a decent local boy.  Like many other tales from the romance comics, "I Ran Away with a Truck Driver" depicts the suffering undergone by a young woman who believes she wants thrills but, disillusioned, returns to the quiet life. The story reiterated traditional male perspectives on female behavior.

References 
 

Romance comics